Bärenreiter (Bärenreiter-Verlag) is a German classical music publishing house based in Kassel.  The firm was founded by Karl Vötterle (1903–1975) in Augsburg in 1923, and moved to Kassel in 1927, where it still has its headquarters; it also has offices in Basel, London, New York and Prague. The company is currently managed by Barbara Scheuch-Vötterle and Leonhard Scheuch.

Since 1951, the company's focus has been on the New Complete Editions series for various composers. These are urtext editions, and cover the entire work of the selected composer.  Series include: J. S. Bach (the Neue Bach-Ausgabe, a joint project with the Deutscher Verlag für Musik), Berlioz, Fauré, Gluck, Handel, Janáček, Mozart (Neue Mozart-Ausgabe), Rossini, Saint-Saëns, Schubert (New Schubert Edition), Telemann and others.

Amateur theater 
For decades, Bärenreiter published hundreds of titles for community theaters, schools, and church groups. The selection numbered 333 plays in 1959. The initiative was closely connected to the editor and dramatist Rudolf Mirbt.

References

External links
 Bärenreiter website
  IMSLP article about the company
Leonhard Scheuch Interview – NAMM Oral History Library (2016)
Barbara Scheuch-Vötterle Interview – NAMM Oral History Library (2016)

Music publishing companies of Germany
Sheet music publishing companies
Publishing companies established in 1923
Companies based in Hesse
Mass media in Kassel
Opera publishing companies
1923 establishments in Germany